The Proportional Representation League was an organization founded in 1893 in the campaign for the adoption of the Proportional representation system of voting at the city, state and federal level in the U.S. (There was a separate Proportional Representation League in the United Kingdom as well.) Many Canadians as well as Americans were active in the League. The date of its demise is unknown but its newsletter, The Proportional Representation Review, apparently ceased publication in 1932.

The Proportional Representation League was founded at the Memorial Art Institute of Chicago at the World's Columbian Exposition on August 10–12, 1893, to promote the cause of proportional representation within the United States. Its activities included distributing information to inquirers on the reform and publishing pamphlets, books and The Proportional Representation Review.

Prominent members included Rhode Island Governor Lucius F. C. Garvin, federal judge Albert Branson Maris, and economist and labor reformer John R. Commons.

Robert Tyson, a resident of Toronto (Canada), was the editor of the PR Review from 1901 to 1913. He met with Australian PR pioneer Catherine Helen Spence, president of the Effective Voting League of South Australia, when she visited Canada in 1891. In 1903 he conducted the election of the executive of the Trades and Labour Congress using Hare-Spence PR (Single transferable voting). Tyson authored two pamphlets that were published by the PR League -- Proportional Representation including its relationship to the Initiative and Referendum (1904) and Proportional Representation - its Principles, Practice and Progress, with description of the Swiss Free List, the Hare Spence Plan and the Gove System ( Clarence Gilbert Hoag became editor of the PR Review in 1914. Hoag had authored the pamphlet The Representative Council Plan of City Government, published by the PR League in 1913.   Hoag also was co-author (with George Hervey Hallett) of the book Proportional Representation (1926).

Statement of League's beliefs
Here is a statement of the beliefs of the PR League.

"WHAT WE ADVOCATE"
"The P. R. League urges the Hare system of proportional representation ("P. R.") for the election of representative bodies.
This system of election gives every group of like-minded voters the share of the members elected that it has of the votes cast.
It does this by giving every voter a single vote, either at large or in a district electing several members, and requiring a separate quota of votes for the election of each member.It allows the voter to make his vote count without knowing whether his favorite can secure the necessary quota or not. All he has to do is to mark not only his first choice but as many alternative choices as he likes. If it is found that his ballot cannot possibly help elect his first choice, it is used instead for the first of his later choices whom it can help.
For a detailed description of the system, see the P. R. League's Leaflet No. 5."

Outside links
 Proportional Representation Review: https://onlinebooks.library.upenn.edu/webbin/serial?id=propreprev (many of the issues of the 1893-1924 period)

References

1893 establishments in the United States
Electoral reform groups in the United States